Alexander Alexandrovich Dolsky (born on July 7, 1938) is a Soviet and Russian poet, writer, artist, and most famously known for being a bard.

Dolsky was born in Sverdlovsk. He graduated from the Ural Polytechnical Institute in 1963 and in the same year he also graduated from Music school, majoring in guitar. He has lived in Saint Petersburg since 1975 where he has worked in the City Building Institute, and as an actor in the Leningrad Miniature Theater (since 1979).

Dolsky started to write songs when he was in high school (1949). He wrote music and poetry for several movies. He has also acted in a few movies. Dolsky wrote music to the poetry of French, English, American, and Russian poets. The following records were published by the recording company Melodiya:

 «Музыка над моей головой» (Music over my head)
 «Старинные часы» (1979) (Antique clock)
 «Звезда на ладони» (1980) (Star in the palm of the hand)
 «Государство синих глаз» (1981) (Nation of blue eyes)
 «Ленинградские акварели» (1983) (Leningrad aquarelles)
 «Теплые звезды» (1985) (Warm stars)
 «Прощай, ХХ век» (1987) (Good bye, ХХ century)
 «Оглянись не во гневе» (1988) (Do not look back in anger)
 «Пейзаж в раме» (1987) (Landscape in the frame)
 «На круги своя»
 «Тайная вечеря» (1991) (Last supper)
 «Российские барды. А. Дольский» (2000)

The following were published as compact disks:

 «Возвращение в Петербург» (1995) (Return to Petersburg)
 «Звезда на ладони» (1995) (Star in the palm of the hand)
 «Ангел-хранитель» (1996) (Guardian angel)
 «Недострелянная птица» (1996)
 «Туманы и дожди» (1997) (Fogs and rains)
 «Русский вопрос» (1997) (Russian question)
 «Трава и ветер» (1997) (Grass and wind)

Since 1996, 10 compact disks have been published with a mix of old and new songs:

 «Старинные часы» (Antique clock)
 «Государство синих глаз» (Nation of blue eyes)
 «Ленинградские акварели» (Leningrad aquarelles)
 «Теплые звезды» (Warm stars)
 «Прощай, ХХ век» (Good bye, ХХ century)
 «Оглянись не во гневе» (Do not look back in anger)
 «Пейзаж в раме» (Landscape in the frame)
 «Музыка над моей головой» (Music over my head)
 «На круги своя»

External links
 Alexander Dolsky

1938 births
Living people
Russian bards
Russian male poets
Russian singer-songwriters
Seven-string guitarists
Russian male singer-songwriters
Soviet male singer-songwriters
Soviet poets
Soviet male writers
20th-century Russian male writers
20th-century guitarists
20th-century Russian male singers
20th-century Russian singers